Tetraneuris torreyana is a North American species of plants in the sunflower family, known by the common name Torrey's four-nerve daisy. It grows in the western United States, in extreme southern Montana, Arizona, New Mexico, Utah, Colorado, and Wyoming.

It forms a branching underground caudex sometimes producing as many as 40 unbranched, above-ground stems. One plant can produce as many as 40 flower heads. Each head has 7–14 yellow ray flowers surrounding 25-150 yellow disc flowers.

References

torreyana
Flora of the Western United States
Endemic flora of the United States
Plants described in 1841
Taxa named by Edward Lee Greene
Taxa named by Thomas Nuttall
Flora without expected TNC conservation status